Bombesin is a 14-amino acid peptide originally isolated from the skin of the European fire-bellied toad (Bombina bombina) by Vittorio Erspamer et al. and named after its source. It has two known homologs in mammals called neuromedin B and gastrin-releasing peptide. It stimulates gastrin release from G cells. It activates three different G-protein-coupled receptors known as BBR1, -2, and -3. It also activates these receptors in the brain. Together with cholecystokinin, it is the second major source of negative feedback signals that stop eating behaviour.

Bombesin is also a tumor marker for small cell carcinoma of lung, gastric cancer, pancreatic cancer, and neuroblastoma.

Receptors
The anuran  receptor homologue is termed .

Effects
Erspamer 1988 finds bombesin has a similar effect on the chicken to ranatensin, unreliably increasing or decreasing blood pressure.

See also 
Gastrin-releasing peptide
Neuromedin B
Neuromedin U

References 

Neuropeptides
Pyrrolidones
Tryptamines
Imidazoles